Dokić is a Serbian surname. Notable people with the surname include:

 Jelena Dokić (born 1983), Australian tennis player
Damir Dokić, father of Jelena Dokić

Serbian surnames